was a Japanese singer and actor. As a singer, he was known as one of the three "Gosanke" (referring to gosanke, the three great Tokugawa houses), along with Yukio Hashi and Kazuo Funaki. The stage name was based on the Meiji Restoration one of three heroes, but also the Kagoshima Local hero Takamori Saigo.

Career
Saigō made his debut in 1964 with the song "Kimi Dake o", for which he won a Japan Record Award for best new artist.

As an actor, he has portrayed people as varied as 20th century Prime Minister Kakuei Tanaka (in the 1983 film Shōsetsu Yoshida Gakkō) and 16th century samurai Katakura Kagetsuna (in the 1987 NHK Taiga drama Dokuganryū Masamune). A native of Kagoshima, he has played the roles of native sons such as Kuroda Kiyotaka and Saigō Tsugumichi, but his characters also include Tokugawa Ieyasu, Yagyū Jūbei and Hattori Hanzō. His roles in Chūshingura tales have included Mōri Koheita (1985).

Saigō has starred in various prime-time television series. These include Edo o Kiru, Genkurō Tabi Nikki Aoi no Abarenbō, Abare Hasshū Goyō Tabi, and Abare Isha Ranzan. NHK has tapped him for various Taiga drama roles as well. Among them are Mōri Hiromoto (in Mōri Motonari, 1997), Sanada Yukimura (Aoi Tokugawa Sandai, 2000), and Honda Masanobu (NHK's Taiga drama Musashi, 2003) in addition to Katakura Kagetsuna. Other NHK roles have included the contemporary daytime drama Niji no Sekkei (1964) and the uncle of the title character in the asadora Wakaba (2004–05).

On 21 February 2022, Sun Music, Saigo's management company, made an announcement that he died after a long battle with prostate cancer in Tokyo, on 20 February.

Filmography

Films
 The Last Samurai (1974)
The Fall of Ako Castle (1978) – Asano Takumi no Kami
Shogun's Samurai (1978) – Tokugawa Tadanaga
Shōsetsu Yoshida Gakkō (1983) – Kakuei Tanaka
Gray Sunset (1985) – Haruo Takano
Ruten no umi (1990)
Listen to My Heart (2009) – Kengo Nakakura

Television
Edo o Kiru (TBS, 1975–81) – Tōyama Kagemoto
Shadow Warriors (1980) – Tsutusmi Kyonosuke
Hissatsu Masshigura! (1986)
Dokuganryū Masamune (NHK, 1987) – Katakura Kagetsuna
Abare Hasshū Goyō Tabi (TV Tokyo, 1990–94) – Tōdō Heihachirō
Mōri Motonari (NHK, 1997) – Mōri Hiromoto
Aoi (NHK, 2000) – Sanada Yukimura
Musashi (NHK, 2003) – Honda Masanobu
Bar Lemon Heart (BS Fuji, 2016) – Shingo Makita
No Side Manager (TBS, 2019) – Hiroshi Shimamoto
The Yagyu Conspiracy (NHK, 2020) – Narrator

References

External links 
 
 Japan Record Awards for 1964
 

1947 births
2022 deaths
Japanese male singers
Japanese male actors
Japanese male pop singers
Japanese lyricists
Japanese male composers
Japanese television presenters
People from Kagoshima
Musicians from Kagoshima Prefecture
Deaths from cancer in Japan
Deaths from prostate cancer